Cáceres is a Spanish surname and placename and may refer to:

 Province of Cáceres, in Spain
 Cáceres (Spanish Congress Electoral District), which covers the province
 Cáceres, Spain, the capital of Cáceres Province, not a bishopric
 Cáceres, Antioquia, municipality in Colombia
 Cáceres, Mato Grosso, in the Brazilian state of Mato Grosso
 Roman Catholic Diocese of São Luíz de Caceres, with the above see
 Ciudad de Nueva Cáceres, former Spanish city in the Philippines
 Roman Catholic Archdiocese of Caceres, with above see
 Cáceres (surname)

See also 
 Bartomeu Càrceres (fl.1546), Catalan composer of ensaladas
 Nueva Cáceres (disambiguation)